Stoneleigh Abbey is an English country house and estate situated south of Coventry. Nearby is the village of Stoneleigh, Warwickshire. The Abbey itself is a Grade I listed building.

History
In 1154 Henry II granted land in the Forest of Arden to a group of  Cistercians from Staffordshire. There are various traces remaining of the original Abbey buildings, most notably the 14th-century Gatehouse.

After the Dissolution of the Monasteries the estate was acquired by Sir Thomas Leigh, Lord Mayor of London in 1558. Charles I gave Leigh the barony for his offering hospitality when the gates of Coventry were closed to the king during the English Civil War. A house was built (which now forms the north and east wings of the present house) on the site of the monastic buildings. It was the home of the Leigh family from 1561 to 1990. In due course the Leigh family became the largest land owner in Warwickshire. 

Between 1714 and 1726 a new palatial four-storey fifteen-bay wing was built to designs by architect Francis Smith of Warwick. The result was an impressive baroque West Wing, built of silver-coloured stone, which was fashionable at that time. The Abbey's remarkable feature is the Saloon, one of the great interiors of Georgian England. Andor Gomme referred to it as "almost the swan song of baroque figurative plasterwork in England".  

From the view over the River Avon we can see some of the changes introduced by Humphry Repton.  During his time he was well known for his works at several large country houses.

In 1806 the estate passed to Rev. Thomas Leigh. He came to view his inheritance, bringing with him his cousin Cassandra Austen and her two daughters, Cassandra and Jane. Jane Austen writes of Repton as the gardener making changes to the grounds at the fictional Sotherton Court in Mansfield Park.  When he undertook the works at Stoneleigh, he hoped to create an arcade on the side of the house overlooking the river.  That never came to fruition, however he did redirect the river (Avon) and flood a section of the river to create a mirror lake. When viewed from a raised platform across the river, the house is perfectly reflected in the surface of the water.  There were two small parterres in front of this side of the house where the grass is now, along with other features of the grounds that can be viewed by walking along the paths (wilderness, mill bridge, weirs, etc.)

The adjacent stables and riding school block and the conservatory are separately listed as Grade II*.

Up until the early 1800s, this side of the house would have looked out on a yard with sheds, pigsties, and other ‘unsightly’ outbuildings. It was during this time that considerations for the health of residents saw the outbuildings move away from the house.  This opened up a good view from the new West Wing, and allowed space for the creation of a cricket pitch.  William Henry Leigh's second son Edward Chandos was an avid cricket player, and was delighted when his father allowed the pitch to be built.  It is said that Lord Leigh would give a silver sixpence to any boy who could break a window of the house with a ball.  It is still used today by Stoneleigh Cricket club and has been voted the most beautiful cricket pitch in England by Wisden.

One of the rooms of the West Wing hosts the bust of Byron by Edward Hodges Baily. Chandos Leigh and Lord Byron were school friends at Harrow and dined together on the day before Byron left England for the last time in April 1816.

Queen Victoria stayed in Stoneleigh Abbey for two nights in 1858. Victoria was given a suite of five rooms with mahogany furniture painted white and gold, since William Henry Leigh was told this was the Queen's preference.

Modern times 
In 1946 Stoneleigh Abbey was one of the first stately homes to open its doors to the public. In 1960 a disastrous fire did extensive damage to the West Wing.

In 1996 Lord Leigh transferred the ownership of Stoneleigh Abbey and its  grounds to a charitable trust, the Stoneleigh Abbey Preservation Trust, of which he himself was the Trustee.  Between 1996 and 2000 it was extensively renovated with the help of grants including a £7.3 million grant from the Heritage Lottery Fund and additional grants of more than £3 million from English Heritage fund and the European Union. More than 1,000 tonnes of Grinshill stone were used to restore the exterior of the West Wing and up to 45 stonemasons were employed during the main stage of the work. The upstairs floors were initially converted into flats by Kit Martin and houses and apartments were established in the West Wing, South Wing and East Wing. The money received by the original Preservation charitable trust was the subject of an episode of The Mark Thomas Comedy Product, which proved that some of the trust's debts were paid using the National Lottery money earmarked for restoration, as well as paying for private development. With the failure of the preservation trust under Lord Leigh, a new independent charitable trust was set up to safeguard the future of the Abbey. With the ties to Lord Leigh severed, the new charitable trust acquired a new chairman, local business man Tony Bird OBE. In the early 2000s Charles Church built two groups of houses in the grounds of Stoneleigh Abbey, named The Cunnery and Grovehurst Park.

The property remains open to the public. The former Orangery now houses a tea room.

A historic pump house and water wheel at Stoneleigh Abbey has been restored to its former glory as part of a large restoration project to save and protect structures in the grounds, along with reinstating many of the views and walks inspired by Sir Humphry Repton's designs from his Red Book also on display at the Abbey. Mr Tony Bird OBE Chairman of the Stoneleigh Abbey Charitable Trust has overseen the full restoration not only of the large wheel but also the full restoration of the 1851 Tangye of Birmingham water pump. The repairs to the Pump House were partly funded by Natural England, including replacement of the roof, years of lime scale being chipped off, and the water wheel itself restored. Stoneleigh Abbey Trustee Dorothy Ingle said: “It is wonderful to see the wheel turning and  people being able to see how the pump house was used now fully restored to its former glory. The wheel doesn’t pump water to the house any more but it still represents part of the history of how the garden and house was operated 100 years ago." The pump-house was built in 1851 on the site of the Abbey's former medieval water mill on the River Avon. Visitors can now see the restored pump house as part of the Abbey's country park.

A historical inquiry 
In 2016, Judy Stove, an Australian researcher into the life and times of Jane Austen, published a book (The Missing Monument Murders) which investigates a series of scandals at Stoneleigh Abbey in the first half of the nineteenth century. Inheritance contests led to claims about the unauthorized removal of monuments from Stoneleigh village church. It was even alleged that a number of witnesses might have been murdered in the period 1812–1815 – within the lifetime of Jane Austen herself. In 1848, Austen's relative Chandos, first Lord Leigh of the second creation (1791–1850), a Romantic poet and Whig essayist, was charged with two of the murders.

Stove examines court transcripts and newspaper accounts from the time, which named the bridge, designed by Scottish engineer John Rennie (1761–1821) and built over the River Avon west of Stoneleigh Abbey, as the possible site of the murder of the workmen. The Rennie bridge still forms the main approach for visitors to Stoneleigh Abbey.

References

Further reading
 A History of the Commoners of Great Britain and Ireland (1835) John Burke pp 223   

External links
 Stoneleigh Abbey
 Stoneleigh Abbey History
 Warwickshire County Council Timetrail
 A History of the County of Warwick, Volume 6 (1951) pp 229–240 from British History Online

1154 establishments in England
Religious organizations established in the 1150s
Monasteries in Warwickshire
Cistercian monasteries in England
Tourist attractions in Warwickshire
Grade I listed buildings in Warwickshire
Christian monasteries established in the 12th century
Historic house museums in Warwickshire